In enzymology, a benzoate 4-monooxygenase (Formerly ) is an enzyme that catalyzes the chemical reaction

benzoate + NADPH + H+ + O2  4-hydroxybenzoate + NADP+ + H2O

The 4 substrates of this enzyme are benzoate, NADPH, H+, and O2, whereas its 3 products are 4-hydroxybenzoate, NADP+, and H2O.

This enzyme belongs to the family of oxidoreductases, specifically those acting on paired donors, with O2 as oxidant and incorporation or reduction of oxygen. The oxygen incorporated need not be derived from O2 with NADH or NADPH as one donor, and incorporation of one atom o oxygen into the other donor.  The systematic name of this enzyme class is benzoate,NADPH:oxygen oxidoreductase (4-hydroxylating). Other names in common use include benzoic acid 4-hydroxylase, benzoate 4-hydroxylase, benzoic 4-hydroxylase, benzoate-p-hydroxylase, and p-hydroxybenzoate hydroxylase.  This enzyme participates in benzoate degradation via hydroxylation and benzoate degradation via coa ligation.  It has 3 cofactors: iron, Tetrahydrobiopterin,  and Tetrahydropteridine.

References

 

EC 1.14.14
NADPH-dependent enzymes
Iron enzymes
Enzymes of unknown structure